Geological Survey of Bangladesh (GSB)  is an national organization working in Geological activities in Bangladesh and is located in  Dhaka, Bangladesh. The incumbent Director General of Geological Survey of Bangladesh is Moinuddin Ahmed.

History
The Geological Survey of Bangladesh was founded in 1971 immediately after the Independence of Bangladesh. The organization was formed out of the remnants of Geological Survey of Pakistan in East Pakistan. The Geological Survey of Pakistan traces its origins to the Geological Survey of India which was founded in 1836. The agency is run by the Ministry of Mineral Resources. It has discovered a number of mines in Bangladesh.

References

1971 establishments in Bangladesh
Organisations based in Dhaka
Geological surveys
Geography of Bangladesh